S'il suffisait d'aimer (retitled S'il suffisait d'aimer (If Only Love Could Be Enough) for the US release) is the sixteenth studio album by Canadian singer Celine Dion, and her eleventh French-language studio album. It was released by Columbia Records on 7 September 1998. The album was mainly written and produced by French singer-songwriter, Jean-Jacques Goldman. It garnered favorable reviews from music critics and became the second best-selling French-language album of all time, after Dion's own D'eux (1995). It includes three hit singles: "Zora sourit", "S'il suffisait d'aimer" and "On ne change pas". S'il suffisait d'aimer won the Juno Award for Best Selling Francophone Album of the Year.

Content and promotion
The project reunited Dion and Jean-Jacques Goldman, who last worked together on the very successful album D'eux. In their first collaboration Goldman wrote songs for Dion, this time he wrote more in his own style, while letting Dion sing her own unique way, like she has been singing a long time ago. Most of the arrangements on that album are simple to let her voice dominate the songs.

During the francophone concerts in the Let's Talk About Love World Tour, Dion performed six songs from S'il suffisait d'aimer. The concerts in Paris were recorded and released as Au cœur du stade in 1999. It was promoted by the video of Dion performing "Dans un autre monde". In addition, video from behind the scenes of the recording session of S'il suffisait d'aimer was included as a bonus on the Au cœur du stade DVD.

Some tracks from S'il suffisait d'aimer were featured on Dion's 2005 greatest hits album On ne change pas.

Critical reception
AllMusic said that "fans will be pleased to hear Dion's return, in a sense, to her roots, especially since the album is about as consistent as any of her albums, both English and French".

Commercial performance
S'il suffisait d'aimer is the second best-selling French album of all time, behind her own D'eux. In its first three weeks of availability worldwide (except the US), it has already sold 2 million copies with 700,000 of it in France alone. To date, It has sold over 4 million copies worldwide, including 2 million in Europe, where it was certified 2× Platinum by the IFPI. 

S'il suffisait d'aimer has sold over 1,890,000 copies in France alone and was certified Diamond. In Canada, it has sold 500,000 copies and was certified 4× Platinum. The album was certified Gold, Platinum and Multi-Platinum around the world, also in non-Francophone countries. S'il suffisait d'aimer became the second, after D'eux, French-language album to be certified Gold in the United Kingdom. In the United States, although a French-language release, it has sold 112,000 copies according to Nielsen SoundScan.

S'il suffisait d'aimer topped the charts in Switzerland (for five weeks), France (for four weeks), Belgium Wallonia (for four weeks), in Quebec (for two weeks) and in Canada, Greece, Poland and on the European Top 100 Albums. It charted inside top 40 in many non-Francophone countries, including the United Kingdom at number 17, or Germany where it peaked at number 11.

Accolades

S'il suffisait d'aimer won a Juno Award for Best Selling Francophone Album. It was also nominated for the Victoires de la Musique in category Pop, Rock Album of the Year and Dion was nominated in category Female Artist of the Year.

Track listing
All tracks produced by Jean-Jacques Goldman and Erick Benzi.

Charts

Weekly charts

Year-end charts

All-time charts

Certifications and sales

Release history

See also
Juno Award for Francophone Album of the Year
List of best-selling albums in France
List of Canadian number-one albums of 1998
List of European number-one hits of 1998
List of number-one singles of 1998 (France)

References

External links
 

1998 albums
Albums produced by Erick Benzi
Celine Dion albums
Juno Award for Francophone Album of the Year albums